Rhodri is a male first name of Welsh origin. It is derived from the elements rhod "wheel" and rhi "king". 

It may refer to the following people:
Rhodri Molwynog ap Idwal (690–754), Welsh king of Gwynedd (720—754)
Rhodri Mawr ap Merfyn (820–878), Welsh king of Gwynedd (844—878), king of Powys (855—878), king of Seisyllwg (872—878)
Rhodri ap Hyfaidd (845—905), Welsh king of Dyfed (904—905)
Rhodri ap Hywel (died 953), Welsh king of Deheubarth (950—953)

Rhodri ab Owain Gwynedd (c. 1147–1195), Welsh prince of part of Gwynedd (1175–1195)
Rhodri ap Gruffudd (1230–1315), Welsh prince

Rhodri Morgan (1939-2017), Welsh politician, First Minister of Wales 2000–2009
Rhodri Glyn Thomas (born 1953), Welsh politician
Rhodri Thompson (born 1960), British lawyer
Rhodri Philipps (born 1966), British peer
Rhodri "Rhod" Gilbert (born 1968), Welsh comedian and presenter
Rhodri Williams (born 1968), Welsh sports journalist
Rhodri Davies (born 1971), improvisational harpist
Rhodri Marsden (born 1971), British writer and musician
Rhodri Owen (born 1972), Welsh television presenter
Rhodri Meilir (born 1978), Welsh actor
Rhodri Smith (born 1982), Welsh scientist
Rhodri Davies (born 1983), Welsh rugby player
Rhodri McAtee (born 1984), Welsh rugby player
Rhodri Jones (born 1991), Welsh rugby player

References

Welsh masculine given names